Horace L. Walker (April 17, 1937 – June 7, 2001) was an American National Basketball Association (NBA) player. As a senior at Michigan State University, he was named to the AP All-America third team.  Walker was then drafted with the sixth pick in the fourth round of the 1960 NBA Draft by the St. Louis Hawks. On June 24, 1961 he was traded to the Chicago Packers for a fourth-round pick in the 1962 NBA Draft. In his one season with the Packers, Walker averaged 6.7 points and 7.2 rebounds per game.

References

1937 births
2001 deaths
All-American college men's basketball players
Amateur Athletic Union men's basketball players
American men's basketball players
Basketball players from Pennsylvania
Chester High School alumni
Chicago Packers players
Michigan State Spartans men's basketball players
Small forwards
Sportspeople from Chester, Pennsylvania
St. Louis Hawks draft picks